Michael Thomas Meeker (born February 23, 1958) is a Canadian former professional ice hockey center who played four games in the National Hockey League for the Pittsburgh Penguins during the 1978–79 season.

Career statistics

Regular season and playoffs

External links
 

1958 births
Living people
Binghamton Dusters players
Canadian ice hockey right wingers
Ice hockey people from Ontario
NCAA men's ice hockey national champions
Nepean Raiders players
Peterborough Petes (ice hockey) players
Pittsburgh Penguins draft picks
Pittsburgh Penguins players
Wisconsin Badgers men's ice hockey players
Sportspeople from Kingston, Ontario